Greenup is a surname of English origin. Notable people with the surname include:

Arthur Greenup (1915–1980), Australian politician
Christopher Greenup (1750–1818), American lawyer and politician
Mary Greenup (1789–1846), British-Colombian businessperson

Surnames of English origin